The Electoral district of Norfolk Plains was a single-member electoral district of the Tasmanian House of Assembly. It was based near the town of Longford to the south of Launceston, Tasmania's second city, and also included the towns of Carrick and Perth.

The seat was created ahead of the Assembly's first election held in 1856, and was abolished at the 1886 election, being replaced with the new Longford seat.

Members for Norfolk Plains

References
 
 
 Parliament of Tasmania (2006). The Parliament of Tasmania from 1956

Norfolk Plains